Safwan Al-Mowallad (born 22 December 1983) is a Saudi Arabian footballer who plays as a forward.

Career
He formerly played for Al-Ahli, Al-Shabab, Al-Hazem, Al-Qadsiah, Al-Nahda, Al-Wahda,  Al-Fayha, Al-Jabalain,  Al-Diriyah, Baish, Al-Ansar, and Al-Majd.

References

External links
 

1983 births
Living people
Sportspeople from Jeddah
Saudi Arabian footballers
Association football forwards
Al-Ahli Saudi FC players
Al-Shabab FC (Riyadh) players
Al-Hazem F.C. players
Al-Qadsiah FC players
Al-Nahda Club (Saudi Arabia) players
Al-Wehda Club (Mecca) players
Al-Fayha FC players
Al-Jabalain FC players
Al-Diriyah Club players
Baish FC players
Al-Ansar FC (Medina) players
Al-Majd Club players
Saudi Professional League players
Saudi First Division League players
Saudi Second Division players
Saudi Fourth Division players